Nationality words link to articles with information on the nation's poetry or literature (for instance, Irish or France).

Events

Works

Great Britain

 Robert Armin, Quips upon Questions; or, A Clownes Canceite on Occasion Offered (writing under the pen name "Clunnyco de Curtanio Snuffe")
 Nicholas Breton:
 Melancholike Humours
 Pasquils Mad-cap and his Message (published anonymously)
 Pasquils Mistresse; or, The Worthie and Unworthie Woman (published under the pen name "Salochin Treboun")
 Pasquils Passe, and Passeth Not
 The Second Part of Pasquils Mad-cap intituled: The Fooles-cap
 Thomas Deloney (uncertain attribution), Patient Grissell, a ballad based on Book 10, novel X of Boccaccio's Decameron
 John Dowland, The Second Booke of Songs or Ayres (First Booke, 1597; Third and Last Booke, 1603)
 Edward Fairfax, translator (of Torquato Tasso's Gerusalemme Liberata), Godrey of Bulloigne; or, The Recoverie of Jerusalem
 Gervase Markham, The Teares of the Beloved; or, The Lamentation of Saint John, Concerning the Death and Passion of Christ Jesus our Saviour
 Christopher Marlowe's translation of Lucan's Pharsalia (posthumous)
 Christopher Middleton, The Legend of Humphrey Duke of Glocester
 Thomas Middleton, The Ghost of Lucrece, a sequel to Shakespeare's Lucrece
 Thomas Morley, The First Booke of Ayres; or, Little Short Songs to Sing and Play to the Lute
 John Norden, 
 Samuel Rowlands:
 The Letting of Humors Bood in the Head-vaine
 A Merry Meeting, ordered burned and no copy is now extant (republished under the title The Knave of Cubbes in 1612)
 Thomas Weelkes' Canto
 John Weever, The Mirror of Martyrs; or, The Life and Death of that Thrice Valiant Captaine, and Most Godly Martyre, Sir John Old-castle Knight Lord Cobham

Anthologies in Great Britain
 Robert Allott (initialed "R. A.", generally attributed to Allott), editor, Englands Parnassus; or, The Choysest Flowers of our Moderne Poets, with their Poeticall Comparisons
 John Bodenham (published anonymously, usually attributed to him, sometimes to Anthony Munday), editor, Bel-vedere; or, The Garden of the Muses, anthology
 John Flasket, Englands Helicon, English anthology with poems by Edmund Spenser, Michael Drayton, Thomas Lodge, Philip Sidney and others

Other
 Siddha Basavaraja, Bedagina Vachanagalu, anthology, India
 François de Malherbe, Ode à la reine sur sa bienvenue en France, recited at the reception given to Marie de Médicis in Aix; the poem attracted the attention of Henry IV of France, to whose court Malherbe is attached in 1605, France
 Romancero general, anthology, Spain

Births
Death years link to the corresponding "[year] in poetry" article:
 January 17 – Pedro Calderón de la Barca (died 1681), Spanish writer, poet and dramatist
 November – John Ogilby (died 1676), Scottish translator, impresario and cartographer
 Also:
 Marin le Roy de Gomberville (died 1674), French poet and novelist
 Piaras Feiritéar (hanged 1653), Irish
 Richard Flecknoe (died 1678), English dramatist and poet
 Petru Fudduni (died 1670), Italian poet writing predominantly in Sicilian
 Johannes Plavius (died unknown), German poet
 Daulat Qazi (died 1638), medieval Bengali poet

Deaths
Birth years link to the corresponding "[year] in poetry" article:
 April – Thomas Deloney (born 1543), English novelist and balladist
 Also:
 Elazar ben Moshe Azikri (born 1533), Jewish kabbalist, poet and writer
 Bâkî باقى pen name Turkish poet Mahmud Abdülbâkî, known as Sultânüş-şuarâ سلطان الشعرا ("Sultan of poets"; born 1526), Turkish poet, called one of the greatest contributors to Turkish literature
 Cyprian Bazylik (born 1535), Polish composer, poet, printer and writer
 Baothghalach Mór Mac Aodhagáin (born 1550), Irish poet of the Mac Aodhagáin clan

See also
 16th century in poetry
 16th century in literature
 17th century in poetry
 17th century in literature
 Dutch Renaissance and Golden Age literature
 Elizabethan literature
 English Madrigal School
 French Renaissance literature
 Renaissance literature
 Spanish Renaissance literature
 University Wits

Notes

16th-century poetry
Poetry